A buyer is someone engaged in purchasing assets.  The term may also refer to:
Buyer (fashion)
Franklin Pierce Buyer (1878–1963), traveling salesman and city counsellor
Steve Buyer (born 1958), former US Congressman from Indiana

See also 
Buyers (disambiguation)